Al Ahly Football Club, commonly referred to as Al Ahly, is an Egyptian professional football club based in Cairo which plays in the Egyptian Premier League. Here is a list of managers who coached the club.

Source:  
Notes
 Note 1: Fathi Mabrouk was an interim manager 5 times.
 Note 2: Manuel José and Hossam El-Badry are the only 3 term managers in Al-Ahly history.
 Note 3: A. Abdul-Shafi was an interim manager 3 times.

References